Kinesin-like protein KIF3B is a protein that in humans is encoded by the KIF3B gene. KIF3B is an N-type protein that complexes with two other kinesin proteins to form two-headed anterograde motors. First, KIF3B forms a heterodimer with KIF3A (kinesin-like protein KIF3A); (KIF3A/3B), that is membrane-bound and has ATPase activity. Then KIFAP3 (KAP3, kinesin superfamily associated protein–3) binds to the tail domain to form a heterotrimeric motor.  This motor has a plus end-directed microtubule sliding activity that exhibits a velocity of ∼0.3 μm/s a. There are 14 kinesin protein families in the kinesin superfamily and KIF3B is part of the Kinesin-2 family, of kinesins that can all form heterotrimeric complexes. Expression of the three motor subunits is ubiquitous. The KIG3A/3B/KAP3 motors can transport 90 to 160 nm in diameter organelles.

There are many orthologous KIF3B genes that are expressed in Drosophila, the sea urchin, Bos taurus, Canis familiaris, Equus caballus, Felis catus, Macaca mulatta, Mus musculus, Pan troglodytes, and Rattus norvegicus.

Function 
The heterotrimeric KIF3B/KIF3A/KAP3 motor machinery functions in the intracellular transport of multiple different molecules such as β-catenin and MT1-MMP. KIF3B activity has been implicated with various cellular processes such as intracellular movement of organelles, intraflagellar transport, chromosome movement during mitosis and meiosis, and cellular interaction with the extracellular matrix.

KIF3B also regulates the interaction of cancer cells with the extracellular matrix (ECM), in particular the transport of MT1-MMP to the cancer cell front is essential for collagen fiber matrix realignment and degradation.

Interactions 

KIF3B has been shown to interact with the SMC3 subunit of the cohesin complex and with RAB4A.

Model organisms 

Model organisms have been used in the study of KIF3B function. A conditional knockout mouse line called Kif3btm1b(EUCOMM)Wtsi was generated at the Wellcome Trust Sanger Institute. Male and female animals underwent a standardized phenotypic screen to determine the effects of deletion. Additional screens performed:  - In-depth immunological phenotyping

References

Further reading